This was the first edition of the tournament.

Nicolás Kicker won the title after defeating Mariano Navone 7–5, 6–3 in the final.

Seeds

Draw

Finals

Top half

Bottom half

References

External links
Main draw
Qualifying draw

Challenger de Villa María - 1